Eric Whiteside (25 October 1904 – 12 May 1997) was an Indian sprinter. He competed in the men's 100 metres at the 1936 Summer Olympics.

References

1904 births
1997 deaths
Athletes (track and field) at the 1936 Summer Olympics
Indian male sprinters
Olympic athletes of India
Place of birth missing